Elections to the municipal and county councils of England and Wales were held in 1889. Elections to the various county councils were held in January 1889. Progressive candidates won a majority on London County Council, although at this point party labels were relatively unimportant, with municipal and county politics in Victorian Britain being somewhat detached from national politics, and national political divisions. Liberal candidates would do particularly well in Wales however, winning clear majorities in 11 of Wales' 13 counties. The Liberals only failed to take Brecknockshire and Radnorshire, which had hung councils. In the English counties the Liberals took only Cumberland, Holland, London, and the West Riding, with most councils being run on a non-party basis.

The elections were the first following the Local Government Act 1888, which had established county councils and county borough councils in England and Wales. Prior to the act there had been no elected body at the county level, with counties being governed by justices of the peace in Quarter Sessions.

A similar act - the Local Government (Scotland) Act 1889 - would later establish county councils in Scotland. Irish local governance would remain unreformed until 1898, and the passing of the Local Government (Ireland) Act 1898.

Results

England

Wales

See also
United Kingdom national and local elections
United Kingdom by-election records

References

 
1889